Christopher William Vane, 10th Baron Barnard  (28 October 1888 – 19 October 1964) was a British peer and military officer.

Education

Lord Barnard was born on 28 October 1888, the second son of Henry de Vere Vane, 9th Baron Barnard, and his wife, the Lady Catharine Sarah Cecil, who was daughter of the 3rd Marquess of Exeter at Barnard Castle in County Durham.

Following in the footsteps of his father, he attended Eton College, but unlike many of his ancestors studied at Trinity College, Cambridge for a B.A. rather than attending the University of Oxford. It was at Cambridge that he joined the Freemasons, being initiated into Isaac Newton University Lodge.

Career

Military 
Upon the completion of his degree, he entered the armed services, participating in World War I as a Major in the Westmorland and Cumberland Yeomanry in which he was awarded the Military Cross and wounded in action twice. His eldest brother, the Hon. Henry Cecil Vane, heir apparent to the barony of Barnard, also served in the Great War but was subsequently wounded and died of those wounds shortly thereafter, leaving his younger brother heir apparent to the title of Baron Barnard.

In 1922, Lord Barnard gained the rank of Major in the 6th Battalion of the Durham Light Infantry and served with distinction in the battalion until 1931.

Civilian 
Upon his retirement from the armed services, Lord Barnard took a number of roles, mostly in the service of County Durham. Between 1920 and 1963 he was Master and, subsequently, Joint Master of the Zetland Hunt and between the years 1958 and 1964 the Lord Lieutenant of Durham. He was also a County Commissioner for the Durham Boy Scouts Association. He was a keen horticulturist.

He was a member of Brooks's gentleman's club and resided at Raby Castle. Unlike his father, he did not keep a London season home at 20 Belgrave Square, SW.

Marriage and issue

On 14 October 1920 he married Sylvia Mary Straker the daughter of Hubert Straker, at St Agatha's, Gilling West, and had three children:

 The Hon. Rosemary Myra Vane (1921–1999)
 Harry John Neville Vane, 11th Baron Barnard (1923–2016)
 The Hon. Gerald Raby Vane (born 1926)

Honours and accolades

Lord Barnard received many honours. In 1930 he was invested as a Commander of the Order of St. Michael and St. George and gained the honorary rank of Colonel in the service of the 6th Battalion of the Durham Light Infantry, his former unit. He was invested as an Officer of the Order of the British Empire in 1955.

Decline and death

In 1964 he gave up the Lord Lieutenancy of County Durham. Notably, a few years before his death he divested himself of all but  of the  Raby estate. He also resigned from the presidency of the County Territorial Army and Air Force Association. He died on 19 October 1964 at the Royal Victoria Infirmary, Newcastle upon Tyne.

External links

References

1888 births
1964 deaths
People educated at Eton College
Alumni of Trinity College, Cambridge
Companions of the Order of St Michael and St George
Durham Light Infantry officers
Lord-Lieutenants of Durham
Officers of the Order of the British Empire
Recipients of the Military Cross
Christopher
Westmorland and Cumberland Yeomanry officers
Barons Barnard
British Freemasons
British Army personnel of World War I
Military personnel from County Durham
Members of Isaac Newton University Lodge